Mike Nardi (born January 30, 1985) is an American basketball coach and former player. He attended  St. Patrick High School in Elizabeth, New Jersey and Villanova University. He is 6'2" 170 lb

Playing career

As a senior in high school, Nardi was a 2003 Parade All-American at St. Patrick.  At Villanova, Nardi was most commonly known for his three-point shooting abilities and his strength off the dribble. He posted 11.8 points per game his senior year.  Nardi was a member of the "four guard lineup" alongside Randy Foye, Allan Ray, and Kyle Lowry, that led the Wildcats to an NCAA tournament number one seed, and an elite eight appearance where they lost to the eventual champions, Florida.  They were ranked as high as the #2 team in the country in 2006 and they never left the top 10 that season.  They split the regular season Big East Conference title with UConn and lost to Pitt in the Big East tournament.

After going undrafted in 2007, Nardi went overseas and has played in Italy and the Netherlands. In 2015, he was playing for Latina Basket, an Italian second division team. Nardi is now a member of the Villanova basketball coaching staff.

References

1985 births
Living people
American expatriate basketball people in Italy
American men's basketball coaches
American men's basketball players
Basketball coaches from New Jersey
Basketball players from New Jersey
Parade High School All-Americans (boys' basketball)
The Patrick School alumni
People from Linden, New Jersey
Point guards
Shooting guards
Sportspeople from Union County, New Jersey
Villanova Wildcats men's basketball coaches
Villanova Wildcats men's basketball players